Watrous is the surname of the following people

Al Watrous (1899–1983), American golfer
Ansel Watrous, American newspaper editor and historian
Bill Watrous (born 1939), American jazz trombonist
Harry W. Watrous (1857–1940), American painter
James Watrous (1908–1999), American painter
Jerome Anthony Watrous (1840–1922), American author, soldier, newspaper editor, and politician
John Watrous (disambiguation)
Malena Watrous, American writer and educator
Mark Watrous, American singer, songwriter, multi-instrumentalist and graphic/video artist 

English-language surnames

fr:Watrous